Gerda de Vries is a Canadian mathematician whose research interests include dynamical systems and mathematical physiology. She is a professor of mathematical and statistical sciences at the University of Alberta, and the former president of the Society for Mathematical Biology.

Education and career
De Vries graduated from the University of Waterloo in 1989, and completed her doctorate in 1995 at the University of British Columbia. Her dissertation, Analysis of Models of Bursting Electrical Activity in Pancreatic Beta Cells, was supervised by Robert M. Miura.

After postdoctoral research with Arthur Sherman at the National Institutes of Health, she joined the University of Alberta faculty in 1998. She was promoted to full professor in 2008.

Publications
De Vries has published highly-cited research on beta cells and beta-actin. With Thomas Hillen, Mark A. Lewis, Johannes Müller, and Birgitt Schönfisch, she is also the author of a 2006 textbook, A Course in Mathematical Biology: Quantitative Modeling with Mathematical and Computational Methods.

Recognition and service
De Vries served as president of the Society for Mathematical Biology for 2011–2013, and became a fellow of the society in 2017.
In 2014 the Canadian Mathematical Society gave de Vries their excellence in teaching award. The society listed de Vries in their inaugural class of fellows in 2018.

References

External links
Home page 

Year of birth missing (living people)
Living people
Canadian mathematicians
Canadian women mathematicians
University of Waterloo alumni
University of British Columbia alumni
Academic staff of the University of Alberta
Fellows of the Canadian Mathematical Society